The Duel is a 2000 Hong Kong wuxia comedy film directed by Andrew Lau and starring Andy Lau, Ekin Cheng, Nick Cheung, Kristy Yang, Zhao Wei and Patrick Tam. The film is adapted from Juezhan Qianhou of Gu Long's Lu Xiaofeng novel series. It is known for its humorous take on the original story and its special effects.

Plot
Dragon Nine, an imperial detective, is on his way back after concluding the case of the Thief Ghost. He encounters "Sword Saint" Yeh, who asks him to tell "Sword Deity" Simon to meet him for a duel on the night of the full moon at the highest rooftop of the Forbidden Palace. News of the upcoming duel between the two greatest swordsmen spread like wildfire and attract much attention, with people starting to place bets on the final outcome. The Emperor sends Dragon Nine and Princess Phoenix to stop the duel from taking place and investigate whether it is a mask for any sinister plots.

Cast
Andy Lau as Yeh Cool Son (Ye Gucheng)
Ekin Cheng as Snow Blower Simon (Ximen Chuixue)
Nick Cheung as Dragon Nine (Lu Xiaofeng)
Zhao Wei as Princess Phoenix
Kristy Yang as Ye Ziqing (Sun Xiuqing)
Tien Hsin as Jade
Patrick Tam as Emperor
Norman Chui as "Thief Ghost" Ling Wun-hok
Elvis Tsui as Gold Moustache
Jerry Lamb as Dragon Seven
Frankie Ng as Dragon Five
Ronald Wong Ban as Dragon Six
Lee Sheung-man as Shek Tsi-lun
Wong Yat-fei as Minister
Liu Wei as Eunuch Lau Tong
Jing Gangshan as Tong Fei
Yin Xiaotian as Tong Ngo
Geng Le as Yim Tsi-chun
Yang Haiquan as Siu Tsi-chung
Liu Hongmei
Hong Yingying
Li Li
Zhan Xiaonan

References

External links

2000 films
2000 action comedy films
2000s Cantonese-language films
2000s fantasy adventure films
2000s martial arts comedy films
Hong Kong action comedy films
Hong Kong martial arts comedy films
Wuxia films
China Star Entertainment Group films
Works based on Lu Xiaofeng (novel series)
Films about duels
Films directed by Andrew Lau
Films based on works by Gu Long
2000s Hong Kong films